Ankolali  is a village / panchayat located in the Gir Gadhada Taluka of Gir Somnath district in Gujarat State, India. Earlier, until August 2013, Ankolali was part of Una Taluka and Junagadh district. The latitude 20.866356 and longitude 70.933183 are the geo-coordinate of the Village Ankolali. Gandhinagar is the state capital of Ankolali village which is located around 400 kilometres away from Ankolali.

According to Census 2011, with the 176 families, the population of this village is 1056. Out of this, 532 are males and 524 are females. Most residents are dependent on agriculture.

Demographics 
According to the 2011 census of India, Ankolali has 176 households. The effective literacy rate (i.e. the literacy rate of population excluding children aged 6 and below) is 65.77%

List of villages in Gir Gadhada Taluka
Below is the Revenue records list of forty-three villages of Gir Gadhada Taluka including Gir Gadhada village.

Ambavad
Ankolvadi
Babariya
Bediya
Bhakha
Bhiyal
Bodidar
Dhokadva
Dhrabavad
Dron
Fareda
Fatsar
Fulka
Gir Gadhada
Harmadiya
Itvaya
Jamvala
Jaragli
Jhanjhariya
Jhudvadli
Juna Ugla
Kanakiya
Kaneri
Kansariya
Khilavad
Kodiya
Mahobatpara
Motisar
Nagadiya
Nava Ugla
Nitli
Panderi
Rasulpara
Sanosri
Sanvav
Sonariya
Sonpura
Thordi
Umedpara
Undari
Vadli
Vadviyala
Velakot

References 

Villages in Gir Gadhada Taluka
Villages in Gir Somnath district